Whatton-in-the-Vale is an English village in the Nottinghamshire borough of Rushcliffe. It lies in the Vale of Belvoir, with the River Smite to the west and the River Whipling to the east, mainly north of the trunk A52 road, 12 miles (19 km) east of Nottingham. It had a population of 843 at the 2011 census.

Etymology
The place name seems to contain the Old English word hwǣte for wheat, + tūn (Old English) meaning an enclosure, a farmstead, a village, an estate, etc., so "Farm where wheat is grown." "In the Vale," i. e. the Vale of Belvoir. The place appears as Watone in the Domesday survey of 1086.

Heritage
Whatton Mill was a five-storey brick tower windmill built in 1820. It had four patent sails (sails with shutters instead of cloth), two of which were double. Milling ceased in about 1916. The capless tower is now a listed building.

The Anglican Church of St. John of Beverley is a Grade II* listed building dating from the 14th century, but extensively restored and rebuilt in the 19th century. It belongs to the Cranmer Group of parishes, with the churches at Aslockton, Hawksworth, Orston, Scarrington and Thoroton. A service is held in Whatton once a month.

The population of Whatton was 306 in 1801, 399 in 1821, and 388 in 1831.

Whatton Manor estate, to the south of the village, was inherited in 1840 by Thomas Dickinson Hall (1808–1879), who built a substantial manor house there in "Elizabethan style". The family financed charitable and church-building work in the district. The manor house and its grounds were sold in 1919 to Samuel Ernest Chesterman, who in turn sold them to William Goodacre Player, son of John Player of the cigarette manufacturers John Player & Sons). The manor building, by then in poor condition, was demolished in the mid-1960s, but the original stables can still be seen from Manor Lane. They now house a stud farm.
	
The village pub, the Griffin's Head, was closed in the mid-1990s and replaced by private housing.

Whatton was once a named telephone exchange for many villages, but the name gave way to a dialling code (01949).

Governance
Whatton has a parish council and belongs under Rushcliffe Borough Council. Since December 1919, the member of Parliament for the Newark constituency, to which Whatton belongs, is the Conservative Robert Jenrick, a former Minister for Housing, Communities and Local Government.

Transport
Whatton is served by Aslockton railway station, less than a mile to the north of the village, which offers services to Grantham and Skegness and to Nottingham and beyond. Its daytime, weekday bus services run to Bingham, Newark-on-Trent, Grantham and elsewhere.

Prison
Whatton (HM Prison) opened at the west end of the village in 1960 as a detention centre. Since 1990 it has been a Category C closed male prison for sex offenders.

References

External links

Details of the conservation area
GENUKI(tm) page
Whatton-in-the-Vale Parish Council
Whatton-in-the-Vale Local History

Civil parishes in Nottinghamshire
Villages in Nottinghamshire
Rushcliffe